Byun Jong-moon (born 2 March 1975) is a South Korean alpine skier. He competed at the 1998 Winter Olympics and the 2002 Winter Olympics.

References

1975 births
Living people
South Korean male alpine skiers
Olympic alpine skiers of South Korea
Alpine skiers at the 1998 Winter Olympics
Alpine skiers at the 2002 Winter Olympics
Sportspeople from Seoul
Asian Games medalists in alpine skiing
Asian Games gold medalists for South Korea
Asian Games bronze medalists for South Korea
Alpine skiers at the 1996 Asian Winter Games
Alpine skiers at the 1999 Asian Winter Games
Alpine skiers at the 2003 Asian Winter Games
Medalists at the 1996 Asian Winter Games
20th-century South Korean people